Iwaki (岩城、磐城) may refer to:

Places
Iwaki, Fukushima (いわき市), a city in Japan
Iwaki, Akita (岩城町), a former town in Japan
Iwaki, Aomori (岩木町), a former town in Japan
Iwaki Province (718) (岩城国), an old province of Japan established in 718 and dissolved by 724
Iwaki Province (1868) (磐城国), an old province of Japan established in 1868
Iwaki River (岩木川), a river in Aomori Prefecture, Japan
Mount Iwaki (岩木山), a volcano on the Japanese island of Honshū

Surname
Iwaki clan: a Japanese clan that ruled the Hamadōri area
, Japanese conductor and percussionist
, Japanese actor
, Japanese politician of the Liberal Democratic Party
, Japanese politician of the Liberal Democratic Party
, a fictional character in the manga Guru Guru Pon-chan

Japanese-language surnames